Kelvin Owusu Boateng (born 24 March 2000) is a Ghanaian  professional footballer who plays as a forward for Spartak Trnava.

Club career
Boateng joined Aves in 2018 from the Right to Dream Academy. Boateng made his professional debut with Aves in a 1-0 Primeira Liga loss to Moreirense F.C. on 29 June 2020.

In 2020, he joined Porto B on loan.

Honours
Spartak Trnava
Slovnaft Cup: 2021–22

References

External links

2000 births
Living people
Footballers from Accra
Ghanaian footballers
Ghanaian expatriate footballers
Association football forwards
C.D. Aves players
FC Porto players
FC Spartak Trnava players
Primeira Liga players
Liga Portugal 2 players
Slovak Super Liga players
Ghanaian expatriate sportspeople in Portugal
Expatriate footballers in Portugal
Ghanaian expatriate sportspeople in Slovakia
Expatriate footballers in Slovakia